Firefox User Extension Library (FUEL) was a JavaScript library intended for developing Mozilla Firefox extensions. Co-created by Mark Finkle and John Resig, it provided JavaScript libraries and wrappers for the most commonly-used operations in Firefox extensions. FUEL was intended to narrow the gap between two modes of development in Firefox. One mode of development extends from the core elements of Firefox and the Firefox code base, which is predominantly based on C++. The other mode of development extends from the client-side functionality of the browser itself, which is predominantly based on JavaScript. This latter mode of development is more familiar to a wide range of users who program web applications. FUEL was intended to make extensions easier to create, especially for this latter group of people.

FUEL was marked as deprecated in Firefox 40 and was removed in Firefox 47.

References

External links
FUEL MozillaWiki

JavaScript libraries
Firefox